Unrestrained Youth is a 1925 American silent drama film directed by Joseph Levering and starring Brandon Tynan, Gardner James and Alice Mann.

Cast
 Brandon Tynan as John Powers
 Gardner James as Jamie Powers
 Mildred Arden as Mary Powers
 Blanche Davenport as Mrs. Powers Sr.
 Jack Hopkins as Fred Whitney 
 Deek Reynolds as Arthur Blake
 Alice Mann as Betty Brown
 Helen Lindroth as Mrs. Brown
 C.H. Keefe as Jerry Powers
 Charles Mcdonald as Stewart Ransom
 Thomas Brooks as Jerry Powers

References

Bibliography
 Nash, Jay Robert. The Motion Picture Guide 1988 Annual. Cinebooks, 1997.

External links
 

1925 films
1925 drama films
1920s English-language films
American silent feature films
Silent American drama films
American black-and-white films
Films directed by Joseph Levering
1920s American films